Japanese aero-engines for military aircraft were given a wide variety of designations depending on the customer. This led to much confusion, particularly among the Allied forces, where a single engine type could have up to six different designations. This situation emerged because of the almost total lack of co-operation in weapons procurement between the IJAAS  (大日本帝國陸軍航空隊 - Dai-Nippon Teikoku Rikugun Kokutai - Imperial Japanese Army Air Service) and the IJNAS  (大日本帝國海軍航空隊 - Dai-Nippon Teikoku Kaigun Koukuu-tai - Imperial Japanese Navy Air Service).

Engines could have designations in any or all of these designation systems:
Army Hatsudoki experimental designation (Kawasaki Ha40)
Army long designation (e.g. Army Type 99 900hp Air Cooled Radial)
Navy experimental designation (Nakajima NK9B)
Navy Name designation ( Nakajima Homare 11)
Manufacturers designation (Nakajima NBA)
Unified system introduced by the Ministry of Munitions in April 1942 (Kawasaki Ha-60)

Data from:Japanese Aircraft 1910–1941 & Japanese Aircraft of the Pacific War & Japanese Aircraft Engines

Army Hatsudoki system
Experimental engines for Army aircraft were given ハ Ha – (エンジン -  Hatsudoki) numbers whilst under design and testing. The Army Ha numbers had no intrinsic meaning and were only sequentially allocated. Sub types could be identified by suffixes -kai, -ko etc., or -I, -II etc..
e.g.:Nakajima Ha115

Army long designation system
Once an engine had been accepted for service in Army aircraft it was given a long designation which denoted the year of introduction, power, cooling method and layout:

e.g.:Army Type 100 1,450hp Air Cooled Radial – (Nakajima Ha111)
The two or three digit Type number denoted the  that the engine was introduced, identical to the Type numbers used in Japanese aircraft long designations from 1925 (From 1927 to 1930 the Type number sometimes denoted the Shōwa or Taisho year ):

After the Type number the power of the engine was denoted in horsepower:
1250 hp

After the power designator the type of engine was denoted:
Air-cooled Radial

Sub-types were designated by suffixes.
Model 1

Navy experimental designation
The IJNAS introduced a designation system for experimental engines and those under development / test before production. Once the engine entered service this designation was replaced by the name or unified system.
Formed from four character groups the IJNAS experimental designation system consisted of
e.g. Nakajima NK9B
First character for manufacturer
A - Aichi
G - Hitachi
I - Ishikawajima
K - Kawasaki
M - Mitsubishi
N - Nakajima
Y – Naval Air Technical Arsenal (Yokosuka and Hiro)
Second Character for engine attributes
K - Air cooled
E - Liquid Cooled
D - Diesel
Third Character for the design number
Fourth Character for the revision code
A - first revision
B - second revision, and so on.

Navy name designation
The simplest of all the systems the IJNAS allocated name characters to engines combined with Model and revision numbers, introduced to reduce confusion and also to reduce the intelligence value of the designation to enemies.
e.g. Nakajima Homare 11 -

Manufacturers designation
Some engines were never allocated a designation or there is no record of such. In which case they are usually identified by the manufacturers designation.
e.g. Mitsubishi A4

Unified  IJAAS / IJNAS designation system
From 1942 the Ministry of Munitions in Japan instituted a Unified aero-engine designation system in an attempt to reduce confusion caused by previous systems. The new system prefixed engine designations with ハ Ha – (エンジン -  Hatsudoki) followed by code numbers identifying each engine in terms of layout, no of cylinders, cooling method and sub-series model numbers.

Thus the Mitsubishi Ha-33-62 金星 Kinsei
Mitsubishi - manufacturer
ハ Ha (エンジン Hatsudoki) - engine.
3 - air-cooled 14-cylinder double-row radial engine.
3 - 140 mm bore, 150 mm stroke.
62 - 60 series engine, second revision.
金星 Kinsei - name

Each engine designation in this system started with the Hatsudoki short hand character, represented by Ha in English, followed by two numbers classifying the engine:

The first digit represented the engine classification:
 Air-cooled inline engine.
 Air-cooled single-row radial engine.
 Air-cooled 14-cylinder double-row radial engine.
 Air-cooled 18-cylinder double-row radial engine.
 Air-cooled, more than 18-cylinders, multi-row radial engine.
 Liquid-cooled 12-cylinder engine.
 Liquid-cooled, more than 12-cylinders engine.
 Diesel engine.
 Special engine.

The second digit represented the bore and stroke of the engine:
0. 130/160
 140/130
 150/170
 140/150
 140/160
 130/150

After the classification digits a two digit number gave the model number and revision state.

Model numbers were given as:

00 – baseline Model, usually prototypes
10
20
30
40
50
60
etc.etc.

A revision (or modification) state number replaced the second digit of the model number:

10 – Model 10 baseline version
11 – Model 10 revision 1
12 – Model 10 revision 2
23 – Model 20 revision 3
62 – Model 60 revision 2

Coincidentally one engine was assigned the same numerical designation in the IJAAS and joint designation systems; Nakajima Ha-45 Homare.

Calendars and Type numbers
Data from:

Table of japanese aero-engine designations

See also
 Japanese military aircraft designation systems
 British military aircraft designation systems
 List of RLM aircraft designations for the Third Reich
 Mark (designation)
 Type (designation)
 World War II Allied names for Japanese aircraft

References

Bibliography

External links
 Japanese Military Aircraft Designations (after 1945)

Aircraft engines
Japanese designation systems